Philippa Garrett Fawcett (4 April 1868 – 10 June 1948) was an English mathematician and educationalist. She was the first woman to obtain the top score in the Cambridge Mathematical Tripos exams. She taught at Newnham College, Cambridge, and at the normal school (teacher training college) in Johannesburg,  and she became an administrator for the London County Council.

Family
Philippa Garrett Fawcett was born on 4 April 1868, the daughter of the suffragist Millicent Fawcett (née Garrett) and Henry Fawcett MP, Professor of Political Economy at Cambridge and Postmaster General in Gladstone's second government. Her aunt was Elizabeth Garrett Anderson, the first English female doctor. When her father died, she and her mother went to live with Millicent's sister Agnes Garrett, who had set up an interior design business on Gower Street, Bloomsbury.

Education
Philippa Fawcett was educated at Bedford College, London (now Royal Holloway) and Newnham College, Cambridge which had been co-founded by her mother.

In 1890, she became the first woman to obtain the top score in the Cambridge Mathematical Tripos exams. The results were highly publicised, with the top scorers receiving great acclaim.  Her score was 13% higher than the second highest, but she did not receive the title of Senior Wrangler (Geoffrey T. Bennett in 1890), as only men were then ranked and women were listed separately. Women had been allowed to take the Tripos since 1880, after Charlotte Angas Scott was unofficially ranked as eighth wrangler. When the women's list was announced, Fawcett was described as "above the senior wrangler". No woman was officially awarded the first position until Ruth Hendry in 1992.

An anonymous poem written in 1890 paying tribute to Fawcett's great achievement climaxes with the following two stanzas, mentioning the other respected mathematicians Arthur Cayley and George Salmon:Curve and angle let her con and
Parallelopipedon and
Parallelogram
    Few can equal, none can beat her
    At eliminating theta
By the river Cam.

May she increase in knowledge daily
Till the great Professor Cayley
Owns himself surpassed
    Till the great Professor Salmon
    Votes his own achievements gammon
And admires aghast.Coming amidst the women's suffrage movement, Fawcett's feat gathered worldwide media coverage, spurring much discussion about women's capacities and rights. The lead story in the Telegraph the following day said:

Career

Following Fawcett's achievement in the Tripos, she won the Marion Kennedy scholarship at Cambridge through which she conducted research in fluid dynamics. Her published papers include "Note on the Motion of Solids in a Liquid".
She was appointed a college lecturer in mathematics at Newnham College, a position she held for 10 years. In this capacity, her teaching abilities received considerable praise. One student wrote:

Fawcett left Cambridge in 1902, when she was appointed as a lecturer to train mathematics teachers at the Normal School (teacher training college) in Johannesburg, then in Transvaal Colony, now part of the University of Pretoria, South Africa. She remained there, setting up schools throughout the country, until 1905, when she returned to Britain to take a position in the administration of education for London County Council. At the LCC, in her work developing secondary schools, she attained a high rank. Denied a Cambridge degree by reason of her sex, she was one of the steamboat ladies who travelled to Ireland between 1904 and 1907 to receive an ad eundem University of Dublin degree at Trinity College.

Fawcett maintained strong links with Newnham College throughout her life. The Fawcett building (1938) was named in recognition of her contribution to the college, and that of her family. She died on 10 June 1948, two months after her 80th birthday, a month after the Grace that allowed women to be awarded the Cambridge BA degree received royal assent (see women's education at the University of Cambridge).

Legacy 
The Philippa Fawcett Internship Programme is a summer research program at the Centre for Mathematical Sciences in the University of Cambridge. It received its first group of interns in 2020.

On the University of Cambridge's West Cambridge site, there exists Philippa Fawcett Drive, alongside roads named after other notable contributors to STEM subjects, such as Ada Lovelace, Charles Babbage, and J. J. Thomson.

See also

Sarah Woodhead, the first woman to attempt, and to pass, the Cambridge Mathematical Tripos exam
Timeline of women in mathematics
Timeline of women in science

References

Further reading
"Philippa Fawcett", Biographies of Women Mathematicians, Agnes Scott College

Rita McWilliams Tullberg, " Philippa Fawcett," Oxford Dictionary of National Biography.
"Philippa Fawcett and the Mathematical Tripos", S.T.C. Siklos, Published 1990

External links
 The Woman Who Bested the Men at Math
 Philippa Fawcett
 Portrait of Phillipa Fawcett at William Morris Gallery

1868 births
1948 deaths
19th-century English mathematicians
British women mathematicians
Alumni of Newnham College, Cambridge
Steamboat ladies